Latisipho pharcidus is a species of sea snail, a marine gastropod mollusk in the family Buccinidae, the true whelks.

Description
(Original description) The shell is of moderate size with a length of 30 mm. Its color is white under an olivaceous periostracum, with. The shell contains six well-rounded whorls exclusive of the (lost) protoconch. The deep suture is distinct.The axial sculpture consists of faint incremental lines. The spiral sculpture consists of a very few hardly visible lines in front of the suture on the upper whorls and near the siphonal canal. Beside these there are irregular divergent raised lines on the periphery, such as have been noted in a number of species but which are doubtfully normal. The aperture is semilunate and 15 mm wide. The outer lip is thin, sharp, slightly arcuate. The inner lip is erased. The columella is short, twisted,attenuate in front and with a pervious  axis. The siphonal canal is wide, short and strongly recurved.

Distribution
This species occurs in the Okhotsk Sea.

References

External links
 Kantor Yu.I. & Sysoev A.V. (2006) Marine and brackish water Gastropoda of Russia and adjacent countries: an illustrated catalogue. Moscow: KMK Scientific Press. 372 pp. + 140 pls

Buccinidae
Gastropods described in 1919